The Fox sitcom Married... with Children aired its pilot on April 5, 1987, and its series finale aired on May 5, 1997, with the episode "The Desperate Half-Hour (Part 1)" and "How to Marry a Moron (Part 2)". A total of 259 original episodes aired during the program's run. All 11 seasons are available on DVD, in Region 1. The list is ordered by the episodes' original air dates. Specials that aired during a regular season run are highlighted in yellow in the list. A season 3 episode, "I'll See You in Court", is known as the "lost episode" and did not air in North America until June 18, 2002, five years after the series' original run.

An animated revival of the series with the original cast returning was revealed to be in the works in May 2022.

Series overview

Episodes

Season 1 (1987)

The first season of Married... with Children introduces the major characters: Al, Peg, Kelly and Bud Bundy, along with their neighbors, Steve and Marcy Rhoades. The first season is the only one in which Al and Peg are regularly intimate, to the point of Al initiating the sessions. It is also the only one where Peg can be seen doing housework under normal circumstances (despite being bad at it), and she even has her own car, a Ford Pinto (as seen in "Sixteen Years and What Do You Get"). In "Thinergy," Bud mentions that Kelly had been held back a year in school.  Al's dislike of the French is first shown in this season and it is also the first time that he calls Marcy a "chicken." It also contains the first mention of Peg's family being "hillbillies" from the fictional Wanker County, Wisconsin.

Season 2 (1987–88) 

At the beginning of the second season, Kelly is portrayed as a girl of reasonable intelligence (though she is often teased by Bud for her promiscuity and bleached hair). By the end, however, her character obtains her trademark stupidity that will become both a plot device and comic focus for the rest of the series. This season also contains the first use of the "Bundy Cheer" and the first instance of the Bundys taking a trip. Additionally, it marked the beginning of the "Thank your father, kids" running gag.  Although Buck is portrayed in later seasons as having been with the Bundys since he was a pup, Peg implies that they have had him for only three years and Al states that he is actually Bud's pet; he even "speaks" once ("Buck Can Do It"), something that becomes a regular feature beginning in the fourth season.  Michael Faustino (David's younger brother) makes the first of five guest appearances during the course of the series.

Season 3 (1988–89) 

The third season marks a notable increase in the show's popularity, based on Terry Rakolta's morality campaign against the show, which began after the episode "Her Cups Runneth Over", where Al and Steve go to a lingerie store in search of Peggy's favorite bra (which had been discontinued). This season also contains the "lost episode" "I'll See You in Court", which was not aired in North America until June 18, 2002, after the show's initial run on the cable channel FX (and was included in the season-three DVD set). Michael Faustino makes his second guest appearance. During the season, the show became the first to have a quarter of the viewership on Fox.

Season 4 (1989–90) 

The fourth season had the departure of Marcy's husband Steve Rhoades. Marcy remained single for the remainder of the season. This was also the first season where the audience would applaud when a major character would enter a scene for the first time in the episode, and a Bundyesque version of the classic film It's a Wonderful Life.  In the episode "It's a Bundyful Life (Part 2)," Ted McGinley makes a guest appearance as Norman Jablonsky before reappearing as a regular cast member in the next season as Jefferson D'Arcy. Also, Michael Faustino makes his third guest appearance.

Season 5 (1990–91)

The fifth season marked the introduction of Jefferson D'Arcy (Ted McGinley), as Marcy's new husband. The series reached its 100th episode this season, which was the pilot for the spin-off Top of the Heap, the first of three spinoffs from Married... with Children. Al's favorite show Psycho Dad is also first referred to in this season, along with his first mention of scoring four touchdowns in one high school football game.

Season 6 (1991–92)

Throughout the season, both Peg and Marcy were pregnant, as Katey Sagal was pregnant in real life. Sagal's child was stillborn six weeks before term, causing her to miss four episodes of this season. At the end of the season's 11th episode,
"Al Bundy, Shoe Dick",  the women's pregnancies were revealed to be merely part of one of Al's nightmares. This season also had Steve Rhoades return for one episode, Kelly becoming the "Verminator", and the Bundys traveling to England. Additionally, this season introduced Bud's hip hop-inspired alter ego "Grandmaster B", concocted to help him with women, which continued after the dream revelation by having Al ask Bud about the nickname and Bud deciding that he likes it enough to use it.

Season 7 (1992–93)

In the seventh season, the writers introduced Seven (played by Shane Sweet) in an attempt to give the Bundys a third child. When the audience was unreceptive, he was removed from the series with no explanation other than being left at the D'Arcys' (Seven was last seen being told a bedtime story in "Peggy and the Pirates"). However, a subtle reference to him is made in season eight, episode 22, when he appears as the missing child on a carton of milk. Bud also loses his virginity during this season and he makes his first appearance with a beard (which was mistaken for dirt in the episode where Bud first notices he is growing a beard). Steve Rhoades also makes another guest appearance during this season, as do Dan Castellaneta and Michael Faustino.

Season 8 (1993–94) 

The eighth season introduces many of Al's friends, including Aaron, Bob Rooney, and Officer Dan (though Officer Dan was not a character in the earlier seasons, the actor who played him also appeared in "Rock 'n Roll Girl" as the sheriff who issued Al a ticket for an insulting bumper sticker, "Weenie Tot Lovers and Other Strangers" as the police officer who arrested Al, and "The Egg and I" as the FBI agent searching for Steve). Al, Jefferson, Bob Rooney, and Officer Dan (along with Griff and Ike, who are introduced in season nine) all become members of NO MA'AM in the episode where the men fight back against a talk show host (played by Jerry Springer) known as "The Masculine Feminist". This is also the season where Bud joins a fraternity.  The closest to an explanation for Seven's mysterious disappearance 14 months before is in the episode "Ride Scare", where a closeup on a carton of milk reveals a picture of Seven with the word "Missing".  Al's plus-sized model friends simply look at it without comment before helping themselves.

Season 9 (1994–95)  

The ninth season rounds out the cast of Al's friends by introducing Griff, who works at Gary's Shoes with Al, and Ike. Steve Rhoades also makes his final two appearances during this season. The season also includes the cancellation of Psycho Dad, Bud getting a job as a driving examiner, and the first appearances of shoe-store owner Gary (who turns out to be a woman), Marcy's niece Amber (who was introduced as a foil for Bud, before being dropped from the show after a couple of episodes), and reporter Miranda Veracruz De La Hoya Cardinal. Michael Faustino makes his fifth and final guest appearance.

Season 10 (1995–96)

The tenth season had the death of family pet Buck and his subsequent reincarnation into the body of Lucky, the Bundys' next dog. The season also marks the first appearances of Peggy's father Ephraim (played by Tim Conway) and Peggy's mother, who moves in with the Bundys (although she is never seen, only heard). Also, Peg leaves Al and goes on a search for her father.

Season 11 (1996–97)

The 11th season was the final season of Married... with Children. Fox moved the show's time slot several times throughout the course of the season, which cost the show ratings. Rising production costs and decreasing viewer shares led to the show's cancellation in April 1997, after the final taping for season 11. Due to this decision, no official "final" episode of Married... with Children was shown. While "How to Marry a Moron" was the final episode to be shot, "Chicago Shoe Exchange" was the last episode that Fox broadcast. This was the only season to feature teaser scenes before the opening credits, and a few episodes during this season also featured tag scenes just before the closing credits. For this season, the still of Al and Peggy sitting on the couch was dropped from the closing credits, which for this season are shown against a black background and in a separate card format, instead of scrolling. The opening theme was also greatly shortened, dropping the highway scenes taken from National Lampoon's Vacation, and the scene where Al hands every member of his family money.

Specials

Bundymania was a three-hour-and-forty-five-minute special airing nine dubbed German episodes of the series. The special included interviews with David Faustino, Christina Applegate, Ted McGinley, dog trainer Steven Ritt, Amanda Bearse, and Ed O'Neill.

References

Pseudonyms

 A. 'Bootsie' is a pseudonym for J. Stanford Parker.

Notes

Citations

External links
 AlBundy.net episode search
 IMDb Married with Children Episode List
 
 TV Guide Episode List

Episodes
Married with Children